Eline Olga Coene (born 11 April 1964) is a Dutch badminton player. She competed in women's singles and women's doubles at the 1992 Summer Olympics in Barcelona, and in women's doubles at the 1996 Summer Olympics in Atlanta.

Six times she won the women's singles title at the Dutch National Badminton Championships in 1983, 1984, 1985, 1986, 1989 and in 1992.
Together with Erica van Dijck she also won the Dutch National women's doubles title nine times in 1985 & 1986 and again continuously from 1988 till 1994.

Achievements

World Cup 
Women's doubles

European Championships 
Women's singles

Women's doubles

IBF World Grand Prix
The World Badminton Grand Prix was sanctioned by the International Badminton Federation from 1983 to 2006.

Women's singles

Women's doubles

IBF International Series 
Women's singles

Women's doubles

  BWF International Challenge tournament
  BWF International Series tournament
  BWF Future Series tournament

References

External links

1964 births
Living people
Dutch female badminton players
Olympic badminton players of the Netherlands
Badminton players at the 1992 Summer Olympics
Badminton players at the 1996 Summer Olympics
People from Rhenen
20th-century Dutch women
21st-century Dutch women
Sportspeople from Utrecht (province)